The T.S. Carlyon Cup is a Melbourne Racing Club Group 3 Thoroughbred open horse race run under set weight conditions with penalties over a distance of 1600 metres at Caulfield Racecourse in Melbourne, Australia in February. Total prize money is A$200,000.

History

Name
 1977–2000 - T.S. Carlyon Cup
 2001–2015 - Carlyon Cup
 2016 - T.S. Carlyon Cup

Distance
 1977–1994 – 2000 metres
 1995 – 1800 metres
 1996–1997 – 1600 metres
 1998–2000 – 1800 metres
 2001–2005 – 1600 metres
 2006–2010 – 1400 metres
 2011 onwards - 1600 metres

Grade
 1977–1979 - Principal Race
 1980–2002 - Group 2 
 2003 onwards  - Group 3

Venue
 1977–1995 -  Caulfield Racecourse
 1996 - Sandown Racecourse
 1997–2022 -  Caulfield Racecourse
 2023 - Sandown Racecourse

Winners

 2022 - Earlswood
 2021 - Best Of Days
 2020 - Miss Siska 
 2019 - Avilius
 2018 - Gailo Chop
 2017 - Burning Front
 2016 - Burning Front
 2015 - Smokin' Joey
 2014  - Chase The Rainbow
 2013  - Budriguez
 2012  - Manighar
 2011  - Lord Pyrus
 2010  - Rightfully Yours
 2009  - Time Matters
 2008  - Publishing
 2007  - Apache Cat
 2006  - Live In Vain
 2005  - Niagara Falls
 2004  - La Sirenuse
 2003  - No Deposit
 2002  - Piper Star
 2001  - Northerly
 2000  - Skoozi Please
 1999  - Thackeray
 1998  - Delinquent
 1997  - Peep On The Sly
 1996  - Toil
 1995  - Starstruck
 1994  - Station Hand
 1993  - Veandercross
 1992  - Cool Credit
 1991  - Prince Salieri
 1990  - Marwong
 1989  - Super Impose
 1988  - Black Charleston
 1987  - Cossack Warrior
 1986  - The Vagrant
 1985  - Astrolin
 1984  - Admiral Lincoln
 1983  - Trissaro
 1982  - Granite King
 1981  - Mr. Independent
 1980  - There You Go
 1979  - Marceau
 1978  - Hyperno
 1977  - Ngawyni

See also
 List of Australian Group races
 Group races

References

Horse races in Australia
Caulfield Racecourse